Lucas Misael Necul (born 21 August 1999) is an Argentine professional footballer who plays as an attacking midfielder for Super League Greece 2 club Ierapetra.

Club career
Necul began his youth career with stints in Club Comercio and Club J.J. Moreno, prior to his signing with Arsenal de Sarandí. He was promoted into the Argentine Primera División side's first-team towards the end of 2017–18, participating in his debut on 14 April 2018 in a 3–0 loss to Belgrano. A further two league appearances followed during that season, which ended with relegation. In the subsequent Primera B Nacional campaign, Necul scored his first goal in a match against Ferro Carril Oeste on 2 December 2018; in a season which they concluded with promotion.

International career
Necul, in 2019, was selected for that year's Pan American Games in Peru by Fernando Batista's U23s. Necul netted in the final versus Honduras, as Argentina beat the Central American team to win the competition.

Career statistics
.

Honours
Argentina U23
Pan American Games: 2019

References

External links

1999 births
Living people
People from Puerto Madryn
Argentine footballers
Argentina youth international footballers
Footballers at the 2019 Pan American Games
Pan American Games gold medalists for Argentina
Pan American Games medalists in football
Association football midfielders
Argentine Primera División players
Primera Nacional players
Arsenal de Sarandí footballers
Medalists at the 2019 Pan American Games